, also known by the nicknames ,  and "TJ", is a Japanese actor and comedian.

Takada was born in Chōfu, Tokyo. He is known for the variety show Tensai, Takeshi no Genki ga Deru Terebi that was hosted by Takeshi Kitano and premiered on NTV from 1985 to 1996. On April 9, 2017, Takada began co-hosting a radio program with manga artist Naoki Urasawa.  airs Sundays at 5pm on Nippon Cultural Broadcasting and features both men talking about their lives, professions, and favorite hobbies.

Filmography

Film
 Mr.Jiren Man Shikijō Kurui (1979)
 Scrap Story: Aru Ai no Monogatari (1984)
 Moonlight Serenade (1997)
 Karaoke: Jinsei Kami Hitoe (2005) as Nikichi Endō
 Kisarazu Cats Eye World Series (2006) Mayor Kandori
 Pavilion Sanshōuo (2006) as Shirō Ninomiya
 Piano no Mori (2007)
 Clearness (2008)
 Flying☆Rabitts (2008) as Director Hayashi
 Homecoming (2011) as Kazuaki Tokita
 Stigmatized Properties (2020)

Television
Minami-kun no Koibito (1994)
 Wagaya no Rekishi (2010)
 Kyotaro Nishimura Travel Mystery (2012–present) as Detective Kamei

Dubbing
Ice Age: The Meltdown, Fast Tony

References

External links
Talent agent profile 

1947 births
Living people
Japanese male actors
Japanese comedians
People from Western Tokyo